The 1993 VMI Keydets football team was an American football team that represented the Virginia Military Institute (VMI) as a member of the Southern Conference (SoCon) during the 1993 NCAA Division I-AA football season. In their fifth year under head coach Jim Shuck, the team compiled an overall record of 1–10, with a mark of 1–7 in conference play, placing ninth in the SoCon. Shuck was fired in December. He compiled a record of 14–40–1 during his tenure of head coach of the Keydets from 1989 through 1993.

Schedule

References

VMI
VMI Keydets football seasons
VMI Keydets football